Saor is the Irish and Scottish Gaelic word for "free".

Saor is a Caledonian Metal band from Scotland formed in 2013 by Andy Marshall. The band is currently signed to Season Of Mist.

Saor Éire
Saor Uladh
Gubbaun Saor
Saor